Puri is an Indian surname from the  Khatri community of Punjab. 

They have origins in the district of Lahore in Majha Punjab. Puri Khatris were the hereditary governors (qanungos) in Pathankot and Batala. Gharat Khasa village near Sialkot was also held by the Puri Khatris.

Origin and etymology
The Dictionary of American Family Names by the Oxford University Press notes that puri means a small town in Punjabi but it is uncertain whether this is related with the surname.

Another theory derives it from the Purus, the mythological Indo-Aryan tribe.

Buddha Prakash, Professor of History and of Ancient Indian History, Culture and Archaeology, Director of the Institute of Indic Studies, said:

Notable people

Bankers
 Aditya Puri, Managing Director, HDFC Bank Limited
 K. R. Puri, former Governor of the Reserve Bank of India. Former MD at LIC India.

Businessmen and Managers
 Aroon Purie, Indian businessman and the founder & editor in chief of India Today
 Deepak Puri, founder of Moser Baer
 Madhabi Puri. chairperson of the securities regulatory body Securities and Exchange Board of India (SEBI). 
 Ratul Puri, Chairman of the Board of Director of Hindustan Power.

Film actors
 Amrish Puri, Bollywood and Hollywood film actor
 Amrita Puri, Bollywood film actress
 Madan Puri, Bollywood film actor
 Mayur Puri, Indian screenwriter, lyricist, actor and film-maker 
 Om Puri, Bollywood and Hollywood film actor
 Pearl V Puri, Indian Television actor
 Vibhu Puri, Indian film director, writer and lyricist. A gold medalist from the Film and Television Institute of India (FTII).
 Dylan Makesh Puri, Canadian actor

Independence activists and martyrs 

 Ram Nath Puri, Indian freedom fighter best known as the editor of Circular-i-Azadi.
 Haqiqat Rai Puri, Hindu martyr

Journalists
 Balraj Puri, journalist, writer and human rights activist
 Kavita Puri, British journalist, radio broadcaster, and author. She wrote the 2019 book, "Partition Voices: Untold British Stories"
 Narottam Puri, Indian sports journalist and broadcaster.
 Pratima Puri, Indian journalist best known for being Doordarshan’s first newsreader. 
 Rajinder Puri, Indian cartoonist, veteran columnist and political activist. He was on the staff of The Hindustan Times and The Statesman.
 Shri Gopal Puri, Indian journalist

Politicians
 Hardeep Singh Puri, Indian cabinet minister
 Lakshmi Puri, former assistant secretary-general at the United Nations and the former deputy executive director of UN Women.
 Manjeev Singh Puri. retired Indian civil servant of the Indian Foreign Service cadre and the former Ambassador of India to Nepal
 Raghunath Sahai Puri, Minister for Housing & Urban Development in Punjab Government.
 Ranjeev Puri, American state representative

Singers
 Sanam Puri, Lead Vocalist of the Independent music band SANAM and Bollywood Singer
 Samar Puri, Guitarist in the band SANAM, popularly known as 'Flying Guitarist'. He is also the sibling of Sanam Puri.

Science and academia 

 Baij Nath Puri, Indian historian and author.
 Ishwar Puri, Indian-American and Canadian scientist, engineer, and academic.
 Jyoti Puri, Professor of Sociology at Simmons University.
 Manju Puri, Indian-American economics professor at Duke University and editor at the Review of Financial Studies. Currently the director of the American Finance Association.
 Munish Chander Puri,  Professor Emeritus of Mathematics at IIT Delhi.
 Neel Kamal Puri, Indian author and teacher
 Madan Lal Puri, Indian-American mathematician and statistician

Spirituality 

 Harbhajan Singh Puri, He was the spiritual director of the 3HO (Healthy, Happy, Holy Organization)

Sports
 Indu Puri, eight-time national table tennis Champion and former international Indian Table Tennis Player. Arjuna Awarded
 Rishi Puri. He is a two time Indian National Sudoku Champion. He was part of the top three solvers from India at the World Sudoku Championships.
 Sangeeta Puri, former swimmer who competed in the Commonwealth and Olympic Games. She won a gold and silver medal at 1993 Central American and Caribbean Games.
 Sunita Puri, a former member of the Indian Women's Hockey Team. Arjuna Awarded

See also
List of Khatris

References

Indian surnames
Social groups of India
Khatri clans
Punjabi tribes
Khatri surnames
Surnames of Indian origin
Punjabi-language surnames
Hindu surnames